Ohrid (also transliterated as Okhrid) is a village (село) in northwestern Bulgaria, located in the Boychinovtsi municipality of the Montana Province.

References

Villages in Montana Province